Casale Cremasco-Vidolasco is a comune (municipality) in the Province of Cremona in the Italian region Lombardy, located about  east of Milan and about  northwest of Cremona.  It was formed in 1935 through the merger of the two communities of Casale Cremasco and Vidolasco.

Casale Cremasco-Vidolasco borders the municipalities of Camisano, Castel Gabbiano, Pianengo, Ricengo, and Sergnano.

References

Populated places established in 1935